Rivers of Steel National Heritage Area is a federally designated National Heritage Area in southwestern Pennsylvania, centered on Pittsburgh and oriented around the interpretation and promotion of the region's steel-making heritage. The area roughly covers the valleys of the Ohio, Monongahela and lower Allegheny rivers. Major interpretive locations include the Carrie Furnace, Pinkerton's Landing Bridge and other features of the Homestead Steel Works.

The national heritage area comprises Allegheny, Armstrong, Beaver, Butler, Greene, Fayette, Washington and Westmoreland counties.

Rivers of Steel National Heritage Area was designated in 1996 and is managed by the Rivers of Steel Heritage Corporation. The managing organization supports the designation of Homestead Works National Park, centered around the Carrie Blast Furnaces.

The visitor center, museum, and offices for the national heritage area are located in the Bost Building in Homestead.

References

External links
 Rivers of Steel National Heritage Area official website
 Rivers of Steel National Heritage Area @ NPS
 Rivers of Steel National Heritage Area @ LOC

 
1996 establishments in Pennsylvania
National Heritage Areas of the United States
Protected areas established in 1996
Protected areas of Allegheny County, Pennsylvania
Protected areas of Armstrong County, Pennsylvania
Protected areas of Beaver County, Pennsylvania
Protected areas of Butler County, Pennsylvania
Protected areas of Greene County, Pennsylvania
Protected areas of Fayette County, Pennsylvania
Protected areas of Washington County, Pennsylvania